Euryarthron is a genus of beetles in the family Cicindelidae, containing the following species:

 Euryarthron babaulti (W. Horn, 1926)
 Euryarthron benningseni (W. Horn, 1897)
 Euryarthron bocandei (Guerin-Meneville, 1849)
 Euryarthron bouvieri (Babault, 1921)
 Euryarthron brevisexstriatum (W. Horn, 1922)
 Euryarthron cosmemosignatum (W. Horn, 1914)
 Euryarthron dromicarium (H. Kolbe, 1894)
 Euryarthron festivum (Dejean, 1831)
 Euryarthron gerstaeckeri (W. Horn, 1898)
 Euryarthron gibbosum (W. Horn, 1894)
 Euryarthron nageli Cassola, 1983
 Euryarthron oscari (W. Horn, 1904)
 Euryarthron planatoflavum (W. Horn, 1922)
 Euryarthron postremus Schule & Werner, 2008
 Euryarthron quadristriatum (W. Horn, 1897)
 Euryarthron reticostatum (W. Horn & Wellman, 1908)
 Euryarthron revoili (Fairmaire, 1882)
 Euryarthron saginatum (W. Horn, 1912)
 Euryarthron sodalis Schule & Werner, 2008)
 Euryarthron waageni (W. Horn, 1900)
 Euryarthron waltherhorni Cassola, 1983

References

Cicindelidae